Huanxi Yuanjia, also translated into English as Enemies Enamoured, Enemies in Love, and Lovers and Foes, is a late Ming dynasty Chinese short story collection by a writer under the pseudonym Xihu yuyin zhuren (西湖漁隱主人). 

The collection was published in the early 17th-century and features a wide variety of love stories that range from erotic to comical in twenty-four chapters.

Notes

Citations

Ming dynasty literature
Chinese short story collections
Chinese erotic novels